The Minister of Fisheries is a councilor of state in the Ministry of Fisheries and Coastal Affairs (Norway). The incumbent minister is Bjørnar Skjæran of the Labour Party. 

The position was created 1 July 1946. Between 2004 and 2013 the minister held the name of Minister of Fisheries and Coastal Affairs reflecting a broadening in responsibility for the ministry. When Solberg's Cabinet took office, the minister was again called Minister of Fisheries and did no longer have responsibilities for coastal affairs.

The Ministry of Fisheries and Coastal Affairs was abolished in January 2014, but the minister post was kept, and now heads responsibilities for fisheries in the new Ministry of Trade and Fisheries, alongside the Minister of Trade.

Ministers
Key

List of ministers

References 

Government of Norway